Holland Thompson was a teacher, state legislator, religious leader, and civil rights advocate in Alabama. He represented Montgomery County, Alabama in the Alabama House of Representatives during the Reconstruction era.

A former slave, he served as a city councilor (alderman?) after the American Civil War. He helped form the Alabama Baptist Missionary Convention and the Dexter Avenue Baptist Church. He advocated for schools, police, and cemeteries for African Americans.

See also
African-American officeholders during and following the Reconstruction era

References

Members of the Alabama House of Representatives
People from Montgomery County, Alabama
American former slaves
19th-century American politicians
African-American activists
African-American politicians during the Reconstruction Era
Educators from Alabama
Year of birth missing
Year of death missing